In enzymology, a corticosteroid side-chain-isomerase is an enzyme that catalyzes the chemical reaction

11-deoxycorticosterone  20-hydroxy-3-oxopregn-4-en-21-al

Hence, this enzyme has one substrate, 11-deoxycorticosterone, and one product, 20-hydroxy-3-oxopregn-4-en-21-al.

This enzyme belongs to the family of isomerases, specifically those intramolecular oxidoreductases interconverting aldoses and ketoses.  The systematic name of this enzyme class is 11-deoxycorticosterone aldose-ketose-isomerase.

References

 
 

EC 5.3.1
Enzymes of unknown structure